Pfeiffer-Wheeler American Chestnut Cabin is a historic log cabin located at the  Pfeiffer Nature Center, Portville in Cattaraugus County, New York. It is a log cabin constructed of American Chestnut in 1941.  It is thought to be one of very few examples of a private residence utilizing American chestnut log frame construction from this period.

It was listed on the National Register of Historic Places in 2002.

References

External links
 Pfeiffer Nature Center

Houses on the National Register of Historic Places in New York (state)
Houses completed in 1941
Log cabins in the United States
Houses in Cattaraugus County, New York
National Register of Historic Places in Cattaraugus County, New York
Log buildings and structures on the National Register of Historic Places in New York (state)